Austroaeschna christine is a species of large dragonfly in the family Telephlebiidae, 
known as the S-spot darner. 
It is found in the vicinity of Eungella National Park in North Queensland, Australia, where it inhabits the upper reaches of small streams.

Austroaeschna christine is a dark dragonfly with pale markings. It appears similar to the sigma darner, Austroaeschna sigma, which is found in mountainous areas of northern New South Wales and southern Queensland and the multi-spotted darner, Austroaeschna multipunctata, which is found in the mountains of southern New South Wales and Victoria.

See also
List of dragonflies of Australia

References

Telephlebiidae
Odonata of Australia
Endemic fauna of Australia
Taxa named by Günther Theischinger
Insects described in 1993